The Eastern Treatment Plant is an  sewage treatment plant, located in the suburb of Bangholme in Victoria, Australia,  southeast of Melbourne's central business district.

The plant was built in 1975 and is owned by Melbourne Water. Following treatment, some water is used as recycled water in the local area. South East Water is a major supplier of recycled water from the Eastern Treatment Plant. The rest is pumped through  of pipeline to discharge into Bass Strait at Boags Rocks on the Mornington Peninsula.

Description
The plant is on an  site bordered by the Patterson River to the north, the Mornington Peninsula Freeway to the west, and the EastLink Tollway to the south and east.

The plant treats around 40 percent of Melbourne's sewage — about  a day — from about 1.5 million people, mainly in the eastern and south-eastern suburbs.  It generates some of its own electricity, as well as heating and cooling power from biogas.

Upgrade
After years of lobbying by community groups led by the Clean Ocean Foundation, as of November 2011, the Eastern Treatment Plant was undergoing an upgrade to reduce environmental impact of the water discharge and increase water reuse applications of the water. The wastewater will be treated by ozone, biological filters, ultraviolet disinfection, and chlorine.  The UV disinfection system that will be installed at the Plant will be the largest in Australia, consisting of 7 closed-vessel UV reactors.

Birds
Along with the nearby Edithvale-Seaford Wetlands, the ETP is part of the Carrum Wetlands Important Bird Area (IBA) and supports many bird species of regional, state, national and international conservation significance.  Species for which the IBA is globally important are the sharp-tailed sandpiper, blue-billed duck, chestnut teal and Australasian bittern.  There is no public access to the ETP for birdwatchers but the birdlife has been monitored since 1998 by monthly surveys conducted by Birds Australia, with 177 species recorded for the site.

See also
 Western Treatment Plant
 Altona Treatment Plant

References

Important Bird Areas of Victoria (Australia)
1975 establishments in Australia
Sewage treatment plants in Australia
Water management in Victoria (Australia)
Industrial buildings in Victoria (Australia)
Sewerage infrastructure in Victoria (Australia)
Buildings and structures in the City of Greater Dandenong
Buildings and structures completed in 1975